Boconnoc Park is a locality in the Mid North region of South Australia. It is on the lower slopes on the west side of the Clare Valley. The current boundaries of the locality were set in 2001.

Boconnoc Park was a sheep station. It was bought by George Brooks in 1905 from Harry Carter, who had owned it since at least 1885. It had been in the Carter family since 1859.

References

Towns in South Australia